Empresas Copec is a Chilean energy and forestry company with a chain of gas stations throughout Chile.

Copec was founded in 1934. The first president of Copec, Pedro Aguirre Cerda, later became president of Chile. Today Roberto Angelini Rossi is the president of Copec.

Copec expanded its activities to the sale of tires and accessories, machinery, and vehicles in 1941. It participated in the formation of Petroleum Navigation Company (SONAP 1943), National Society Pipeline (SONACOL, 1956).

During the 1970s Copec extended its activities through the purchase of Celulosa Arauco, Forestal Arauco and cellulose Constitution later forming one of its main subsidiaries Celulosa Arauco y Constitución.

Copec founded the Chilean Homeware company Abcdin in 1950.

In 2016, Copec entered the United States  by acquiring MAPCO Express from Delek US.

References

Further reading

.

External links

 Copec

Energy companies of Chile
Oil and gas companies of Chile
Chilean companies established in 1934
Companies based in Santiago
Energy companies established in 1934
Non-renewable resource companies established in 1934
Chilean brands
Companies listed on the Santiago Stock Exchange